Fodinoidea vectigera is a moth of the family Erebidae. It was described by Paul Mabille in 1882. It is found on Madagascar.

References

Spilosomina
Moths described in 1882